Saista Khedi is a village in the Bhopal district of Madhya Pradesh, India. It is located in the Huzur tehsil and the Phanda block.

The Baba Dayadas temple, constructed with funding in crores from the villagers, is located in Saista Khedi. A special prayer, which is conducted in the temple every Monday evening, attracts people from the entire village as well as neighbouring areas.

Demographics 

According to the 2011 census of India, Saista Khedi has 152 households. The effective literacy rate (i.e. the literacy rate of population excluding children aged 6 and below) is 89.05%.

References 

Villages in Huzur tehsil